Pledge is a 2018 American horror film, written by Zack Weiner, directed by Daniel Robbins, and produced by Mark Rapaport and Keaton Heinrichs. The film centers on collegiate hazing taken to extremes. It had its world premiere at the 2018 Fantasia International Film Festival, and was released in theaters and on VOD on January 11, 2019 through IFC Midnight.

Cast
 Zachery Byrd as Justin
 Aaron Dalla Villa as Max
 Zack Weiner as David
 Phillip Andre Botello as Ethan
 Cameron Cowperthwaite as Ricky
 Jesse Pimentel as Bret
 Joe Gallagher as Ben
 Jean-Louis Droulers as Sam
 Erica Boozer as Rachel
 Melanie Rothman as Stacey

Production
Pledge finished its principal photography in the summer of 2016 in New Rochelle, NY and New York City. Part of the film's post-production finances were sourced through Kickstarter.

Release and reception
The film had its world premiere at the 2018 Fantasia International Film Festival on July 24, 2018 and its United States premiere on October 14, 2018 at Screamfest, where it won awards for Best Directing (Daniel Robbins) and Best Editing (Nik Voytas). The film was later released theatrically and on VOD via IFC Midnight. Pledge had a limited theatrical release in 20 cities across the United States, with additional theatrical releases in Latin America through foreign distributors. Pledge has received generally positive reviews from critics, with  score on Rotten Tomatoes with its consensus stating, "Pledge leaves a certain amount of potential untapped in its extreme take on collegiate hazing, but the end result is still well-executed enough to be worth a watch."

Jeanette Catsoulis of The New York Times called the film "a ringing indictment of popularity as the cheese in a deadly mousetrap" and praised Zachery Byrd's performance as Justin, in particular.  Dennis Harvey of Variety called Pledge, "a lean and mean shocker that tells its tale of collegiate hazing run amuck with brute efficiency." Noel Murray of The Los Angeles Times said "the movie understands that — whether comedy or horror — all these stories are really about a desperate yearning for belonging."

References

External links
 
 

2018 films
2018 independent films
American horror films
IFC Films films
Films about hazing
Films shot in New York City
Kickstarter-funded films
2010s English-language films
2010s American films